The 1959 United Kingdom general election was held on Thursday, 8 October 1959. It marked a third consecutive victory for the ruling Conservative Party, now led by Prime Minister Harold Macmillan. For the second time in a row, the Conservatives increased their overall majority in Parliament, this time to a landslide majority of 100 seats, having gained 20 seats for a return of 365. The Labour Party, led by Hugh Gaitskell, lost 19 seats and returned 258. The Liberal Party, led by Jo Grimond, again returned only six MPs to the House of Commons, but managed to increase its overall share of the vote to 5.9%, compared to just 2.7% four years earlier.

The Conservatives won the largest number of votes in Scotland, but narrowly failed to win the most seats in that country. They have not made either achievement ever since. Both Jeremy Thorpe, a future Liberal leader, and Margaret Thatcher, a future Conservative leader and eventually Prime Minister, first entered the House of Commons after this election.

Background
After the Suez Crisis in 1956, Anthony Eden, the Conservative Prime Minister, became unpopular. He resigned early in 1957, and was succeeded by Chancellor of the Exchequer Harold Macmillan. At that point, the Labour Party, whose leader Hugh Gaitskell had succeeded Clement Attlee after the 1955 general election, enjoyed large leads in opinion polls over the Conservative Party, and it looked as if Labour would win.

The Liberal Party also had a new leader, Jo Grimond, so all three parties contested the election with a new leader at the helm.

However, the Conservatives enjoyed an upturn in fortunes as the economy quickly recovered from the Recession of 1958 under Macmillan's leadership, and his personal approval ratings remained high. At the same time, the Labour Party's popularity suffered due to the rise of industrial disputes in the 1950s and controversies over the Campaign for Nuclear Disarmament. By September 1958, the Conservatives had moved ahead of Labour in the opinion polls. Parliament was dissolved on 18 September 1959.

Campaign
All the three main parties had changed leadership since the previous election. The Conservatives fought under the slogan "Life is better with the Conservatives, don't let Labour ruin it" and were boosted by a pre-election economic boom. Macmillan very effectively "summed up" the mood of the British public when he said that most of the people had "never had it so good". Macmillan was very popular, and was described as a politician of the centre ground; in the 1930s he had represented a constituency in northern England (Stockton-on-Tees), which had experienced large-scale unemployment and poverty during the Great Depression. The first week of polling put the Conservatives ahead of Labour by over 5%, but this narrowed as the campaign continued. The Labour Party fought a generally effective campaign, with television broadcasts masterminded by Tony Benn under the umbrella of their manifesto entitled Britain Belongs to You, which accused the Conservatives of complacency over the growing gap between rich and poor. Labour's manifesto pledged to reverse reductions in welfare benefits, pensions, and National Health Service expenditure; renationalize the steel industry and road haulage; reform secondary education; expand consumer protections; and create the Welsh Office. It notably promised not to fully nationalise industries which were performing efficiently and profitably, pivoting away from its earlier emphasis on socialism towards welfare capitalism. Hugh Gaitskell made a mistake in declaring that a Labour government would not raise taxes if it came to power—even though the Labour manifesto contained pledges to increase spending; especially to increase pensions. Although Gaitskell argued revenue would be provided by economic growth, led some voters to doubt Labour's spending plans, and is cited as a key reason for their defeat.

Results
Early on during election night, it became clear that the Conservative Party had been returned to government with an increased majority, performing better than it had been expected to. For the fourth general election in a row, the Conservatives increased their number of seats, despite experiencing a slight decrease in their share of the vote. However, there were swings to Labour in parts of north-west England, and in Scotland; where Scottish Labour had overtaken the Conservative-aligned Unionist Party as the largest single party in terms of seats, despite winning a slightly smaller share of the vote, thanks to overturning narrow majorities in several constituencies. Future Prime Minister Margaret Thatcher was elected to the House of Commons for the first time as the MP for Finchley, where she would represent until her retirement from politics 33 years later at the 1992 general election.

For Labour, the result was disappointing; despite appearing more united than they had in recent years under Gaitskell's leadership, the party suffered a third consecutive defeat. James Callaghan believed that the Conservatives increased their majority in part because working-class Labour voters were still angry at the party for opposing the Suez conflict. Many of both the Labour Party's supporters and opponents, including Prime Minister Macmillan himself, also blamed the Gaitskellite leadership for spending more time preparing to form a government with the assumption that they would win the election than actually campaigning or offering criticism of the Conservative Party's leadership. Political scientists Mark Abrams and Richard Rose blamed Labour's electoral losses from 1959 onwards on an "embourgeoisement" in which British voters identified increasingly with the middle class, leaving Labour's appeals to the working class less effective. Another key factor was the decline of support of younger voters after 1955, although older voters over the age of 65 increased support for the party in 1959 because of its pledges to expand pensions.

While the Liberal Party earned more than twice as many votes compared to the previous general election, this was largely the result of them nominating nearly double the number of candidates that they did four years prior; their average number of votes-per-candidate only slightly improved. Future Liberal Party Leader Jeremy Thorpe was elected to Parliament for the first time, as the MP for North Devon.

The Daily Mirror, despite being a staunch supporter of the Labour Party, wished Macmillan "good luck" on its front page following his election victory.

The BBC Television Service's election coverage, presented by Richard Dimbleby, was shown on BBC Parliament on 9 October 2009 to mark the fiftieth anniversary of the election and again on 9 October 2019 to mark the sixtieth anniversary.

The 1959 general election was the first election to be covered by commercial television in the United Kingdom. The ITV network provided election night coverage from the studios of Independent Television News (ITN) in London, with ITV given permission by the Independent Television Authority to use all of the ITV companies on air in 1959 for election links to the main studio in London. Ian Trethowan was the presenter for the ITV coverage.

|-
|+ style="caption-side: bottom; font-weight:normal" |All parties shown.
|}

Votes summary

Seat summary

Transfers of seats 
 All comparisons are with the 1955 election.
In some cases the change is due to the MP defecting to the gaining party. Such circumstances are marked with a *.
In other circumstances the change is due to the seat having been won by the gaining party in a by-election in the intervening years, and then retained in 1959. Such circumstances are marked with a †.

1 Sinn Féin winner in 1955 overturned on petition. The second-placed Ulster Unionist candidate was also overturned, by resolution of the House; eventually the 1956 by-election was held, which returned an Independent Unionist. This candidate later defected to the Ulster Unionists.
2 Sinn Féin winner in 1955 overturned on petition for criminal conviction. The second-placed candidate, an Ulster Unionist, was awarded the seat. He retained it in 1959.
3 Seat had been won by the Liberals in a 1958 by-election.

See also 
List of MPs elected in the 1959 United Kingdom general election
List of MPs for constituencies in Scotland (1959–1964)
1959 United Kingdom general election in Northern Ireland

Notes

References

Sources

External links
United Kingdom election results—summary results 1885–1979

Manifestos
The Next Five Years, 1959 Conservative Party manifesto
Britain Belongs to You: The Labour Party's Policy for Consideration by the British People, 1959 Labour Party manifesto
People Count, 1959 Liberal Party manifesto

 
1959
General election
General election
Harold Macmillan
Hugh Gaitskell